Karjat taluka, is a taluka in Karjat subdivision of Ahmednagar district in Maharashtra State of India.

Area
The table below shows area of the taluka by land type.

Villages
There are around 118 villages in Karjat taluka. For list of villages see Villages in Karjat taluka.

Population
The table below shows population of talukas by Gender as per 2001 census.

Rainfall
The Table below shows the details of average rainfall from June–October for the period 1981 to 2011.

See also

 Talukas in Ahmednagar district
 Villages in Karjat taluka

References

Talukas in Ahmednagar district
Talukas in Maharashtra